This is a list of surf musicians. Surf music is a genre of popular music associated with surf culture, particularly as found in Orange County and other areas of Southern California. It was especially popular from 1961 to 1966, has subsequently been revived and was highly influential on subsequent rock music.

1950s, 1960s

The Atlantics
The Astronauts
The Beach Boys
The Bel-Airs
Bruce & Terry
Al Casey
The Centurians
The Challengers
The Champs
The Chantays
Jerry Cole
Dick Dale
Eddie & the Showmen
The Fantastic Baggys
The Fender IV
Jim Fuller
Mr. Gasser & the Weirdos
The Hondells
The Honeys
Jan & Dean
Paul Johnson
Bruce Johnston
The Lively Ones
The Marketts
Terry Melcher
Jim Messina & the Jesters
The Navarros
Sandy Nelson
The Orange Peels
Richard Podolor
The Pyramids
The Revels
The Rip-Chords
The Rivieras
The Rockin' Rebels
Ronny & the Daytonas
Royale Monarchs
The Sandals
The Sentinals
The Shadows
The Spinners
The Sunrays
The Surfaris
Takeshi Terauchi
The Tornadoes
The Trashmen
Gary Usher
The Ventures

Later revivalists

Agent Orange
Allah-Las
The Apemen
Aqua Velvets
Atomic 7
The Bambi Molesters
The Barracudas
Beach Fossils
Best Coast
Blue Hawaiians
The Bomboras
Greg Camp (of late 1990s band Smash Mouth, currently of Defektor)
Martin Cilia
Shana Cleveland
Daikaiju
Laramie Dean
The Drums
Dum Dum Girls
The El Caminos
Toulouse Engelhardt
Fidlar
The 5.6.7.8's
Donavon Frankenreiter
Les Fradkin & Get Wet
The Fresh & Onlys
The Ghastly Ones
The Good The Bad
The Growlers
Ash Grunwald
Ben Howard
Huevos Rancheros
Chris Isaak
Jetpack
Jon and the Nightriders
King Gizzard & the Lizard Wizard (earlier releases)
La Luz
Langhorns
Laika & the Cosmonauts
Lo Presher
Man or Astro-man?
The Mermen
Messer Chups
Monsters from Mars
The Mulchmen
The New Electric Sound
No Age
Par Avion
The Phantom Surfers
Phono-Comb
Pixies
The Raybeats
Red Elvises
Reef
The Reigning Monarchs
The Reverb Syndicate
Rootjoose
Les Savy Fav
Shadowy Men on a Shadowy Planet
Shannon and the Clams
Cody Simpson
Los Straitjackets
Sublime
Surf City
Surf Coasters
Surf Curse
Surf Punks
Surfer Blood
Susan and the Surftones
The Tarantulas
The Thurston Lava Tube
The Trashwomen
Eddie Vedder
Vivian Girls
Wallows
Wavves
Whirled Peas
The Young Werewolves
The Ziggens
Y Niwl

References

Surf